Kingston State Park is a  state park located on Great Pond in the town of Kingston, New Hampshire. The park offers  of swim area with a bathhouse, canoe rentals, fireplaces and picnic areas, a playground, softball field, and three game areas for horseshoes and volleyball. A pavilion can be rented.

The park connects to Rock Rimmon State Forest.

References

External links
Kingston State Park New Hampshire Department of Natural and Cultural Resources

State parks of New Hampshire
Parks in Rockingham County, New Hampshire
Kingston, New Hampshire